The 2018 NRL Women's Premiership is the first season of professional women's rugby league in Australia.

Round 1

Round 2

Round 3

Grand Final

References

External links

Results